John Schmidt (28 April 1833, Wirschweiler – 4 September 1905, Muskego, Wisconsin) was a member of the Wisconsin State Assembly during the 1864, 1880 and 1893 sessions. He served as a Republican affiliated with the National Union Party and as a Democrat.

References

1833 births
1905 deaths
People from Birkenfeld (district)
People from Waukesha County, Wisconsin
Prussian emigrants to the United States
19th-century American politicians
Democratic Party members of the Wisconsin State Assembly
Republican Party members of the Wisconsin State Assembly